The voiceless palatal affricate is a type of consonantal sound, used in some spoken languages. The tie bar may be omitted, yielding  in the IPA and cC in X-SAMPA.

This sound is the non-sibilant equivalent of the voiceless alveolo-palatal affricate.

The voiceless palatal affricate occurs in such languages as Hungarian and Skolt Sami, among others. The consonant is quite rare; it is mostly absent from Europe (with the Uralic languages and Albanian being exceptions). It usually occurs with its voiced counterpart, the voiced palatal affricate.

There is also the voiceless post-palatal affricate in some languages, which is articulated slightly more back compared with the place of articulation of the prototypical voiceless palatal affricate, though not as back as the prototypical voiceless velar affricate. The equivalent X-SAMPA symbols are c_-_C_- and k_+_x_+, respectively.

Features
Features of the voiceless palatal affricate:

 It is not a sibilant.
 The otherwise identical post-palatal variant is articulated slightly behind the hard palate, making it sound slightly closer to the velar .

Occurrence

See also
Index of phonetics articles

Notes

References

External links
 

Palatal consonants
Affricates
Pulmonic consonants
Voiceless oral consonants
Central consonants